Abel Fernando Moreira Ferreira  (born 22 December 1978), known simply as Abel as a player, is a Portuguese football manager and former player who is the current head coach of Brazilian club Palmeiras.

As a right-back, he played 234 Primeira Liga matches over 11 seasons (three goals), with Vitória de Guimarães, Braga and Sporting CP. With Sporting, he won two Taça de Portugal and as many Supertaça Cândido de Oliveira, in a 14-year professional career.

Ferreira started working as a manager in 2013, being in charge of Sporting CP B, Braga B, Braga, PAOK and Palmeiras. With the latter club, he won the Copa do Brasil in 2020, two successive Copa Libertadores in 2020 and 2021 and the Campeonato Brasileiro Série A in 2022.

Playing career

Abel was born in Penafiel, Porto District. After emerging through his hometown club Penafiel's youth ranks, he moved to Vitória de Guimarães where he made his Primeira Liga debut. He then signed with Braga for the 2004–05 season.

Abel transferred to Sporting CP in January 2006, in a two-way loan deal involving the Brazilian Wender. The move was made permanent before the 2006–07 campaign.

On 27 November 2007, Abel scored a goal against Manchester United in a UEFA Champions League group stage 2–1 away loss. In that season he was also called up for the Portugal national team, but did not earn any caps.

In 2008–09, Abel lost his starting position to Pedro Silva. Both players lost their importance in the squad after the purchase of Braga's João Pereira in January 2010.

Abel was still regularly used in the following seasons, as Pereira featured regularly as a midfielder. On 24 October 2010, he scored his first league goal for Sporting, in the 90th minute to defeat Rio Ave at home (1–0).

Abel retired at the end of the 2010–11 season aged 32, due to injury problems.

Coaching career

Braga
Ferreira started working as a manager immediately after retiring, taking charge of Sporting's juniors as well as their reserves in the Segunda Liga. In February 2015, he was appointed manager at Braga B in the same division.

On 26 April 2017, Ferreira succeeded Jorge Simão at the helm of Braga's first team. In his first full season in charge he led them to fourth place, with subsequent qualification for the UEFA Europa League's third qualifying round.

PAOK

PAOK paid a reported €2 million to acquire Ferreira's services on 30 June 2019, after former manager Răzvan Lucescu left for Al Hilal of Saudi Arabia. In his first year, the team were knocked out by Ajax in the Champions League third qualifying round when the opposition scored through two controversial penalties in the second leg. They were eliminated by Slovan Bratislava in the Europa League playoff round. On the domestic front, he led the side to second place in the Super League Greece, but was also in charge as the club's record of 51 matches unbeaten came to an end. They also reached the semi-finals of the Greek Cup.

Ferreira left the Toumba Stadium on 30 October 2020, following a 0–0 draw at Granada in the Europa League group stage.

Palmeiras

Ferreira was announced as head coach of Brazilian club Palmeiras that same day, on a two-year deal. He made his debut on 5 November 2020 in the last-16 second leg of the Copa do Brasil in a 1–0 home win against Red Bull Bragantino (4–1 aggregate). Three days later, on his Campeonato Brasileiro Série A debut, his team won away to Vasco da Gama.

On 30 January 2021, Ferreira won his first title as coach with a 1–0 victory over fellow Brazilians Santos in the final of the 2020 Copa Libertadores; only two other non-South American managers had won the tournament before, one being his compatriot Jorge Jesus, a year earlier, also with a Brazilian side, Flamengo.

On 7 March 2021, Palmeiras won the second leg of the Brazilian Cup final with a 2–0 home defeat of Grêmio, with the aggregate score being 3–0. Owing to this result, Ferreira became the first foreign coach to win the competition. On 27 November that year, his team retained the Libertadores with a 2–1 extra-time win in the final against Flamengo at the Estadio Centenario in Montevideo.

The team defeated Athletico Paranaense 2–0 at Allianz Parque on 2 March 2022, winning the Recopa Sudamericana for the first time. This was the third international championship won by Ferreira with the side, also making him the club's most successful head coach in those type of competitions.

Personal life

Ferreira married Ana Xavier in 1996, with whom he had daughters Inês and Mariana. In March 2021, he was decorated with the Commander of the Order of Infante D. Henrique.

Managerial statistics

Honours

Player
Sporting CP
Taça de Portugal: 2006–07, 2007–08
Supertaça Cândido de Oliveira: 2007, 2008

Manager
Palmeiras
Campeonato Brasileiro Série A: 2022
Copa do Brasil: 2020
Supercopa do Brasil: 2023
Copa Libertadores: 2020, 2021
Recopa Sudamericana: 2022
Campeonato Paulista: 2022
FIFA Club World Cup runner-up: 2021

Individual
Copa Libertadores Coach of the Year: 2020, 2021
Troféu Mesa Redonda: 2020
Best Coach in Brazil by O Globo/Extra: 2020
South American Coach of the Year: 2021
Best Portuguese Coach Abroad by CNID: 2022
Bola de Prata Coach of the Year: 2022
Campeonato Brasileiro Série A Coach of the Year: 2022

Orders
 Knight Commander of the Order of Prince Henry

References

External links

1978 births
Living people
People from Penafiel
Sportspeople from Porto District
Portuguese footballers
Association football defenders
Primeira Liga players
Liga Portugal 2 players
F.C. Penafiel players
Vitória S.C. players
S.C. Braga players
Sporting CP footballers
Portugal B international footballers
Portuguese football managers
Primeira Liga managers
Liga Portugal 2 managers
Sporting CP B managers
S.C. Braga managers
Super League Greece managers
PAOK FC managers
Campeonato Brasileiro Série A managers
Sociedade Esportiva Palmeiras managers
Portuguese expatriate football managers
Expatriate football managers in Greece
Expatriate football managers in Brazil
Portuguese expatriate sportspeople in Greece
Portuguese expatriate sportspeople in Brazil